Look into the Eyeball is the sixth studio album by musician David Byrne, released on May 8, 2001. The single "Like Humans Do" was supplied with the Windows XP operating system to showcase Microsoft's Windows Media Player.

"" is a Spanish language song, performed with Nrü (a.k.a. Rubén Isaac Albarrán Ortega) from Café Tacuba. The title means "I Am Unknown" in English.

As of August 2001 the album has sold 63,000 copies in United States according to Nielsen SoundScan.

Track listing
All songs written and arranged by David Byrne

Personnel
David Byrne – vocals and guitar, keyboards on "Walk on the Water", Mellotron on "Everyone's in Love with You", and timpani on "The Accident"

Additional musicians
Thom Bell – Rhodes on "Neighborhood"
Herb Besson – trombone
Virgil Blackwell – clarinet on "Smile"
Kysia Bostic – back-up vocals
Paulo Braga – percussion on "The Great Intoxication"
Vinicius Cantuária – percussion on "The Great Intoxication"
Bob Carlisle – French horn
Tara Chambers – cello
Vivian Cherry – back-up vocals
Greg Cohen – upright bass
Imani Coppola – back-up vocals on "Everyone's in Love with You"
Nick Cords – viola
Michael Davis – trombone
Larry Etkin – flugelhorn and trumpet on "Broken Things"
Bruno Eicher – violin
Arlen Fast – bassoon on "The Accident""
Paul Frazier – bass guitar
Robert Funk – trombone on "Broken Things"
Karen Griffin – piccolo
Dawn Hannay – viola
Jim Hayes – trumpet on "Like Humans Do"
Birch Johnson – trombone on "Broken Things"
Bradley Jones – bass on "The Revolution", baby bass on "Everyone's in Love with You"
Rodd Kadleck – trumpet
Vivek Kamath – viola
Lisa Kim – violin
Judy Leclair – bassoon on "The Accident""
Ken Lewis – bass and keyboards
Eileen Moon – cello
Kristina Mosso – violin
Maxim Moston – violin
Nrü (a.k.a. Rubén Isaac Albarrán Ortega) – vocals on "Desconocido Soy"
Suzanne Ornstein – violin
Sandra Park – violin
Rajnhidur Pejursdottir – violin
Shawn Pelton – drum kit and percussion
Susan Pray – viola
Dan Reed – violin
Mauro Refosco – percussion
Robert Rinehart – viola
Stewart Rose – French horn
Roger Rosenberg – baritone saxophone
Marlon Saunders – back-up vocals
Laura Seaton – violin
Sarah Seiver – cello
Fiona Simon – violin
Alan Stepansky – cello
John Vercesi – Rhodes on "The Revolution"
Shelley Woodworth – English horn on "The Great Intoxication"
Sharon Yamada – violin

Production
David Byrne – photography
Greg Calbi – mastering 
Danny Clinch – photography
Stephen Doyle – photography
Ken Lewis – engineering, mixing (tracks 2 to 12)
Michael Mangini – producer
Doyle Partners – artwork

Release history

References

External links
DavidByrne.com on Look into the Eyeball

2001 albums
David Byrne albums
Virgin Records albums
Spanish-language albums